The 2013-14 Oman First Division League (known as the Omantel First Division League for sponsorship reasons) is the 38th edition of the second-highest division overall football league in Oman. The season began on 12 September 2014 and concluded on 24 April 2014. Al-Ittihad Club were the defending champions, having won their first title in the previous 2012–13 season.

League table

Promotion/relegation play-off

1st Leg

2nd Leg

References

Oman First Division League seasons
Oman
2013–14 in Omani football